Pratt Institute is a private university with its main campus in Brooklyn, New York.  It has a satellite campus in Manhattan and an extension campus in Utica, New York at the Munson-Williams-Proctor Arts Institute. The school was founded in 1887 with programs primarily in engineering, architecture, and fine arts. Comprising six schools, the institute is primarily known for its programs in architecture, graphic design, interior design, and industrial design.

History

Inception

Pratt Institute was founded in 1887 by American industrialist Charles Pratt, who was a successful businessman and oil tycoon and was one of the wealthiest men in the history of Brooklyn. Pratt was an early pioneer of the oil industry in the United States and was the founder of Astral Oil Works based in the Greenpoint section of Brooklyn which was a leader in replacing whale oil with petroleum or natural oil. In 1867, Pratt established Charles Pratt and Company. In 1874, Pratt's companies amalgamated with John D. Rockefeller's companies and became part of the Standard Oil trust where Pratt continued his active involvement on the board and the running of it.

Pratt, an advocate of education, wanted to provide the opportunity for working men and women to better their lives through education. Even though Pratt never had the opportunity to go to college himself, he wanted to create an affordable college accessible to the working class. In 1884, Pratt began purchasing parcels of land in his affluent home town of Clinton Hill for the intention of opening a school. The school would end up being built only two blocks from Charles Pratt's residence on Clinton Avenue.

From his fortunes with Astral Oil and Charles Pratt and Company, in 1886 he endowed and founded Pratt Institute. In May 1887, the New York State Legislature granted Charles Pratt a charter to open the school; on October 17, 1887, the institute opened to 12 students in the Main Hall. Tuition was $4 per class per term (approximately ). The college was one of the first in the country open to all people, regardless of class, color, and gender. In the early years, the institute's mission was to offer education to those who never had it offered to them before. Pratt sought to teach people skills that would allow them to be successful and work their way up the economic ladder. Specifically, many programs were tailored for the growing need to train industrial workers in the changing economy with training in design and engineering. Early programs sought to teach students a variety of subjects such as architectural engineering, mechanics, dressmaking, and furniture making. Graduates of the school were taught to become engineers, mechanics, and technicians. Drawing, whether freehand, mechanical, or architectural, thought of as being a universal language, united such diverse programs and thus all programs in the school had a strong foundation in drawing. In addition, the curriculum at the institute was to be complemented by a large Liberal Arts curriculum. Students studied subjects such as history, mathematics, physics, and literature in order to better understand the world in which they will be working in, which is still used in Pratt's curriculum.

Early years

Enrollment grew steadily since inception. Six months after opening, the school had an enrollment of nearly 600 students. By the first anniversary of the school there were 1,000 students in attendance. In five years' time the school had nearly 4,000 students.  In 1888, Scientific American said of the school that "it is undoubtedly the most important enterprise of its kind in this country, if not in the world". Andrew Carnegie visited Pratt for inspiration and used the school as a model in developing Carnegie Technical Schools, now Carnegie Mellon University.  At the first Founder's Day celebration in 1888, Charles Pratt addressed what would become the school's motto: "be true to your work and your work will be true to you" - meaning that students should educate and develop themselves diligently and go out into the world working hard, giving all of themselves.

As public interest grew in the school and demand increased, the school began adding new programs including the Pratt High School, Library School, Music Department, and Department of Commerce. Because of the overwhelming popularity of the Department of Commerce, the department broke off from the main institute and formed its own school, under the guidance of Norman P. Heffley, personal secretary to Charles Pratt. The Heffley School of Commerce, the former Pratt Department of Commerce, originally having shared facilities with Pratt, evolved into what is now Brooklyn Law School.

In 1891, the institute's founder and first president, Charles Pratt, died and his eldest son, Charles Millard Pratt, assumed responsibility of president for the school. In 1893, Charles Pratt's other son, Frederic B. Pratt, was elected President of Pratt Institute taking over from his elder brother. Because Charles Pratt Snr. died so soon after the college was founded, Frederic Pratt is ascribed with guiding the college through its early decades. Under the direction of Pratt's sons, the institute was able to thrive both financially and critically with many new construction projects and courses. By 1892, the number of students enrolled was 3,900. In 1897 the most popular major for students was domestic arts.

In 1896, the school opened its monumental Victorian-Renaissance Revival library with interiors designed by the Tiffany Decorating and Glass Company and sprawling gardens outside the library. The library was available not just for students, but to the general public as well. The Pratt Institute Library was the first and only public library in Brooklyn for nearly 15 years. Additionally, the library served as a working classroom for the training of librarians and is cited as one of the first schools of Library science. The Pratt Institute Library also made available the first reading room for children in New York City.

By the turn of the century, The School of Science and Technology had become Pratt's most prestigious and well known school and it constituted most of the school's enrollment  Across from East Building on Grand Avenue, the institute constructed a new quad dedicated specifically for the engineering school. Constructed over a period of a quarter of a century, the Chemistry, Machinery, and Engineering buildings were constructed in the same architecture style, unifying all disciplines offered by the School. Pratt also had a large variety of courses dedicated specifically for women during this time. Some of the 25 courses women could partake in included library science, nursing, home economics, and fashion.

By 1910, all of the departments of the institute were organized as individual schools including the Library School, School of Domestic Science, School of Fine and Applied Arts, and the School of Science and Technology.

Degree-granting status and increase in enrollment

As World War I faced the nation in 1914, Pratt partnered with the United States Government to aid in the war effort. The School of Science and Technology had its own Student Army Training Corps which taught enlistees engineering skills needed for the war. Students designed aircraft used in the war and trained operators. In 1927, mechanical engineering alumnus Donald A. Hall designed the Spirit of Saint Louis, used by Charles Lindbergh in the world's first transatlantic flight.

By the 1938 most programs at the school began offering four-year Bachelor of Science degrees and Pratt transformed itself from being a technical school to a rigorous college .  By granting bachelor's degrees, Pratt had to revise its curriculum from being a two-year school to now being a four-year college. The changes also reflected New York State requirements for granting degrees and stricter government and professional licensing regulations for graduates. During this decade, the foundation program for all Art School students was also founded. In 1940 Pratt began granting graduate degrees.

During World War II Pratt also helped in the war effort as it did during World War I with the engineering school training servicemen before they were deployed. Students helped to design camouflage for soldiers, buildings, and weapons. Following the war, the school saw a large influx of veterans enrolling as part of the GI Bill.

In the 1940s, the School of Science and Technology changed its name to the School of Engineering and in 1946 established its own honor society with mechanical engineering being the most popular major at all of Pratt. In 1953, Francis H. Horn became the first President of Pratt who was not a member of the Pratt family. Enrollment continue to climb throughout the decade and in 1948 the institute reached an all-time high in attendance with 6,000 students. By 1950, Pratt had become an accredited institution by the Middle States Association of Colleges and Schools. In 1954, the architecture department split from the Engineering School to become its own school.

Campus reorganization

As part of white flight in the 1950s and 1960s which affected the majority of New York City the neighborhood of Clinton Hill began to see a transformation from an upper-class, affluent, white community to one chiefly populated by poor and working-class people of color. During this time, Pratt considered moving its campus to more affluent Long Island or Manhattan and increase its attractiveness but decided to stay at its original Brooklyn campus due to the history and Charles Pratt's original mission.

As part of Robert Moses' plan for urban renewal in New York City, Pratt's physical campus saw the greatest amount of change in its history. Prior to the 1950s, the school was located in separate buildings located on several public streets. However, after Moses' clearance of many of the structures located between Pratt's buildings, the land was given over to the school, and a true campus was established. Ryerson Street, Grand Avenue, Steuben Street, and Emerson Place ceased to allow automobile traffic, and the campus became enclosed, forming the Grand Mall to connect the institute's buildings. The elevated train running along Grand Avenue between the East Building/Student Union and the Engineering Quad was dismantled. As a result of new real estate, the school was able to build several new structures, all designed by the firm of McKim, Mead & White, including men's and women's dormitories and a new student union. In addition, Moses' construction projects around the school helped to build the School of Architecture. Research funds were granted to the school to help discover new building techniques. By 1963, the urban planning department formed the Pratt Center for Community Development in an attempt to revitalize Pratt's surrounding neighborhood and Brooklyn.

Enrollment decline and financial issues
In the 1970s and continuing well into the 1980s New York City and Brooklyn still faced large amounts of crime and poverty and as a result enrollment fell and the school began to face a budget deficit. Prospective students and faculty felt uneasy about the safety of the campus and community. In 1974, the men's basketball team came to the attention of national media outlets as Cyndi Meserve joined the team becoming the first woman to play men's NCAA basketball. Students earning architecture degrees exceeded those who were earning mechanical engineering degrees in 1975 and architecture degrees became the most popular degree at Pratt, a trend that still exists. In anticipation of the institute's centennial anniversary in 1987, several capital improvements were made to the campus trying to restore the condition of many of the dilapidated buildings. The Grand Mall was re-landscaped with new plantings, brick pathways, and lighting and the Newman Amphitheater was built in 1988 in celebration of the hundredth anniversary. President Richardson Pratt Jr retired in 1990 after nearly twenty years of serving as president, becoming the last president to be a descendant of founder Charles Pratt.

By 1993, Thomas F. Schutte was appointed as president and has since become the longest standing president overseeing the institute not a part of the Pratt family. In the same year, Pratt controversially closed its School of Engineering, an integral part of founder Charles Pratt's long-term vision for the school. Historically, the school was Pratt's most successful school and many associated the school with its engineering program. In response to the institute-wide decrease in enrollment and school-wide budget issues, closing the School of Engineering was thought of as being the only feasible option to keep the school's other programs afloat and to address the budget. Students in the Engineering program were transferred to Polytechnic Institute of New York University while tenured professors were relocated to the School of Architecture and the science and math departments in the School of Liberal Arts and Sciences.

Revitalization and growth

As a result of closing the costly School of Engineering, the school was able to get out of debt and on the track to financial success. Funds were allocated for campus-wide beautification projects and restoration and modernization of historic buildings, starting with Memorial Hall. Part of the beautification projects included adding the Pratt Institute Sculpture Park in 1999 where contemporary art sculptures are placed throughout the campus lawns and gardens, making it the largest contemporary sculpture park in New York City. Pratt also began a partnership with Munson-Williams-Proctor and Delaware College of Art and Design for art students to study for two years at either campus and finish their degrees at Pratt's School of Art and Design in Brooklyn. During the 1990s the school was able to increase enrollment by twenty-five percent, from approximately 3,000 students in 1990 to 4,000 students in 2000.

Vincent A. Stabile, a 1940 graduate of the School of Engineering, donated about $13 million to Pratt, the largest donation made by any alumnus in the college's history, with the request to President Schutte that the donation be used to reopen the School of Engineering. President Schutte rejected Mr. Stabile's request but instead allocated the funds to construct a new residence hall named in the donor's honor. From the mid-1980s to the 2000s Pratt experienced the transition from being mainly a commuter school to become a residential school through the construction of new residence halls Cannoneer Court, Pantas Hall, and Stabile Hall.

Presidents

 Charles Pratt (1830–1891), president from 1887 to 1891
 Charles Millard Pratt (1855–1935), 1891–1893
 Frederic B. Pratt (1865–1945), 1893–1937
 Charles Pratt (1892–?), 1937–1953
 Francis H. Horn 1953–1957
 Robert Fisher Oxnam (1915–1974), 1957–1960
 Richard H. Heindel 1961-1967
 James B. Donovan (1916–1970), 1968–1970
 Henry Saltzman, 1970-1972
 Richardson Pratt Jr (1923–2001) (grandson of Charles Millard Pratt and great-grandson of Charles Pratt), 1972–1990
 Warren F. Ilchman (1933–), 1990–1993
 Thomas F. Schutte (1936–), 1993–2017
 Frances Bronet, 2018–present

Academics

Rankings

Pratt Institute is currently unranked by U.S. News & World Report. In its specialty rankings, U.S. News & World Report ranks Pratt 8th among "Best Fine Arts Programs" and 34th in "Best Library and Information Studies Programs". The Bachelor of Architecture program has been ranked as being in the top fifteen programs in the United States consistently since 2000 according to Architectural Record. Bloomberg BusinessWeek ranked the school as being one of the top 60 schools in the world to study design, and respondents to a Business Insider survey said that the school was the 6th-best school for design in the world.

While Kiplinger's Personal Finance previously named Pratt as one of the country's best values in private colleges and universities, it is no longer listed in their rankings. It was previously included as one of the top values for academic quality and affordability out of more than 600 private institutions.

In 2021, Pratt Institute was ranked the ninth globally according to the QS World University Rankings by the subject Art and Design.

Schools and academic divisions

Pratt Institute is divided into 6 schools and more than 28 departments and divisions offering over 22 undergraduate majors and 25 graduate majors. 
The schools include:
 School of Architecture
 Department of Undergraduate Architecture
 Department of Construction Management, Facilities Management, and Real Estate Practice
 Department of Graduate Architecture and Urban Design
 Graduate Center for Planning and the Environment
 School of Art
 Department of Art and Design Education
 Department of Arts and Cultural Management
 Department of Creative Arts Therapy
 Department of Digital Arts and Animation
 Department of Design Management
 Department of Film and Video
 Department of Fine Arts
 Department of Photography
 Department of Associate Degrees
 School of Design
 Department of Undergraduate Communications Design
 Department of Graduate Communications Design
 Department of Fashion Design
 Department of Industrial Design
 Department of Interior Design
 School of Liberal Arts and Sciences
 Department of Humanities and Media Studies
 Department of the History of Art and Design
 Department of Math and Science
 Department of Social Science and Cultural Studies
 Department of Writing
 Department of General Education
 Intensive English Program
 School of Information (Pratt has the oldest continuously accredited library-science program in the United States.)
 School of Continuing and Professional Studies

Former schools
 School of Domestic Arts and Sciences
 School of Engineering

Joint degree programs
Pratt Institute offers the following joint degree programs:
 J.D./Master in City and Regional Planning: Brooklyn Law School and Pratt Institute jointly sponsor a program leading to the degrees of Juris Doctor (J.D.) and Master of Science (M.S.) in City and Regional Planning.

Accreditation
Pratt Institute is accredited by the Middle States Association of Colleges and Schools and is authorized to award academic degrees by the State of New York, following guidelines established by the New York State Department of Education.

The Bachelor of Architecture degree and the Master of Architecture degree at the School of Architecture are accredited by the National Architectural Accrediting Board. The undergraduate Interior Design program is accredited by the Council for Interior Design Accreditation.

Graduate programs in Library and Information Science, Art Therapy, and Art Education are all accredited by the Committee on Accreditation of the American Library Association, Education Approval Board of the American Art Therapy Association, and RATE respectively. The School of Art and Design is one of only forty-three schools part of the Association of Independent Colleges of Art and Design.

Demographics

Pratt Institute students, numbering 3,483 undergraduates and 1,392 graduate students in Fall 2019, come from 78 countries and 47 states. Women represent 71% of undergraduates and 74% of graduate students.

Brooklyn campus

Pratt Institute's main campus is located on a historic, esteemed, enclosed  campus located in the Clinton Hill neighborhood in Brooklyn, 2 miles from Downtown Brooklyn and 3 miles from Lower Manhattan. Midtown Manhattan is just 5 miles from the campus.

The campus is accessible by two public entrances, both of which close in the evening hours and are guarded by security 24 hours a day. The main gate located at Willoughby Avenue on the north side of campus is accessible for pedestrians and vehicles while the secondary pedestrian-only gate located at the corner of Hall Street and DeKalb Avenue at the southwest part of campus is convenient for commuters and for students to get to Higgins Hall. In addition, there are three other swipe card access gates available only for student use. The campus is very park-like and fully landscaped and provides a stark contrast to the urban neighborhood which surrounds the school.

The four main areas of the campus include the Library Rose Garden, Cannon Court, Newman Mall and Amphitheater, and the Engineering Quad:
 The historically significant Rose Garden is located directly north of the library and was built as a part of the library acting as a public park. At the center of the garden is a 1926 World War I memorial flagpole detailed with eagles, male, and female busts.
 The Cannon Court is located directly south of the library and serves as the main entrance from the Hall Street gate. A central feature of the court is a large bronze Spanish cannon from 1720 originally from Seville, Spain and brought to Pratt from Morro Castle in Havana, Cuba in 1899. Trees and meandering pathways lead to the library and Newman Mall.
 The Newman Mall takes up the center of the campus with many of the academic buildings alongside the mall. The mall is characterized by brick pathways with mature trees lining a central lawn. To the north of the mall is a small amphitheater, designed by Skidmore, Owings and Merrill.
 The Engineering Quadrangle, which is recognized as a historic landmark, is located north of the Newman Mall toward the eastern side of campus with the Chemistry, Machinery, and Engineering buildings enclosing the quad which has terraced landscaping and gardens with many mature trees.

The entire campus is open to the public as park space during the daytime. Throughout the campus, many contemporary sculptures fill the gardens and landscape, making the campus home to the largest sculpture park in New York City. The sculptures are loaned to Pratt and are changed on a rotating basis. Public Art Review recognized the campus as having one of the 10 best college and university art collections in the country.

List of sculptures on campus

Buildings
Pratt is home to a diverse collection of buildings composed of several architectural styles. Most of the buildings at the school were built before World War II in the style of Romanesque Revival, Victorian, and Neoclassical styles and were designed by prominent nineteenth and twentieth century architects. After the war, Pratt began building more contemporary styled buildings.

In 2011, Architectural Digest named Pratt as being one of the top ten most architecturally significant college campuses in the country, for its seamless collection of buildings ranging from since the 1800s.

The Main Building, East Hall Building, and Student Union are all located adjacent to one another and make up a complex of the original buildings, all built specifically for the Institute in 1887:
 Located at the north-central part of campus, the Main Building is a six-story Romanesque Revival brick building designed by Lamb and Rich and was the first building to open at the school.  The roof features an iconic clock tower, which overlooks the Rose Garden. The building houses administrative offices, classrooms, and art studios for the Arts Department of the School of Art and Design. In February 2013 a fire erupted throughout the top floors of the building, destroying much of the interior structure and students work.
 East Hall is located directly behind Main Hall and faces Grand Walk. Designed by William Windrim, a main feature of the brick building is the large smokestack which served the institute's power generation plant. Within the Hall are a variety of services for students including Career Services, Student Activities, International Student Affairs, and the Pratt Chapel. Located in the lower level of the building is Pratt's continuously operating, privately owned, steam-powered electrical generating plant built originally to serve the power needs of the school. In 1977 the facility was recognized by the American Society of Mechanical Engineers and named a National Mechanical Engineering Landmark.
 The Student Union, by architect William Tubby, was originally built as the Trade School building but soon after completion was completely remodeled as the Student Union complete with gymnasium and swimming pool. In 1982 the building was renovated again as the new Student Union. All three buildings wrap around an interior courtyard which connects out to the Newman Mall and Library Rose Garden. The centerpiece of the courtyard is a 17th-century Italian marble well-head fountain purchased by the Pratt family in 1900.

Other structures include:
 South Hall, located along Reyerson Walk to the direct south of Main Building, was finished in 1892 by William Tubby and was built as the Pratt High School. When the high school closed near the turn-of-the-century, the building was used for the School of Domestic Arts and Sciences. The building is now home to classrooms, studios, and offices for programs in the Department of Fine Arts, part of the School of Art and Design.
 Pratt Institute Library, which was opened in 1888 to serve students and the general public as well, became the first free Public Library in Brooklyn. The architect of the building was William Tubby of Brooklyn. The decoration in the building was done by the Tiffany Glass and Decorating Company.
 The Chemistry, Machinery, and Engineering Buildings are located across from Grand Walk and East Building, which are clustered around the Engineering Quad's lawn and gardens. They were built in phases between 1908 and 1928 and designed by architecture firm Howells & Stokes . These buildings originally housed courses for Pratt's School of Engineering until it was dismantled in 1993. The machinery building houses, a Print lab, Metal Shop, Ceramics Studios and WoodShop. The second floor of the Engineering building now houses Pratt's largest computer lab on campus, with several classrooms of Mac and PC workstations and a collection of scanners, printers, and plotters. The basement houses Pratt's Material Lab and Center for Sustainable Design Strategies.
 The school's auditorium, Memorial Hall, was built in 1927 with John Mead Howells serving as the architect. It is located across from the Rose Garden along Reyerson Walk, between the Main Building and North Hall.
 Built as part of the urban renewal project led by Robert Moses, North Hall is located directly north of Memorial Hall and was designed by McKim, Mead, and White in 1958.  The building houses Pratt's Main cafeteria and the school's bank. Classrooms for the School of Liberal Arts and Sciences are located on the upper levels of the building.
 DeKalb Hall and the Information Science Center were also designed by McKim, Mead, and White earlier in 1955. They originally served as men's and women's dormitories respectively until Pratt acquired Willoughby Hall. After the acquisition of Willoughby, the buildings were remodeled to serve classroom and administrative needs. DeKalb Hall, located to the far west of campus and south of the Library and Cannon Court, is home to administrative offices. The Information Science Center is also located to the far west of campus, but north of the Library and Rose Garden, which was home to the School of Information.
 The Juliana Curran Terian Design Center is made up of two separate wings, Steuben Hall to the east and Pratt Studios west, which hold all of Pratt's design programs. Located at the southern edge of the campus between Pantas Hall and the Athletics and Recreation Center, this building is home to the Interior Design, Industrial Design, Communication Design, and Fashion Design Departments, as well as the givetake art supply recycling initiative. At the center of the building there is a small courtyard. Originally the center was two separate buildings that were acquired by Pratt in 1962 and 1970, respectively. The buildings were originally built around the turn-of-the-century and served as factories until Pratt acquired them. A new glass and metal entry pavilion, named in honor of architecture alumni and donor Juliana Curran Terian, was constructed in 2007  and was designed to the two original, separate, brick buildings. The lead architect for the project was the School of Architecture's Dean, Thomas Hanrahan.
 Myrtle Hall is Pratt's newest building, having opened in 2010. The building, located one block north of campus, was designed by Pratt Institute School of Architecture alumnus Jack Esterson AIA of the New York City architecture and engineering firm WASA/Studio A, and has achieved LEED Gold Certification. The building houses Student Services (registrar, bursar, and financial aid), Admissions, the Pratt Center for Community Development, and the Digital Art Center.
 The Caroline Ladd Pratt House is owned by the school. It is used as the college president's mansion and for gala events. It was completed in 1898 and designed by architects Babb, Cook, and Willard for Frederic B. Pratt, the institute's third president, the son of Charles Pratt (and family). It is located two blocks west of the school on Clinton Avenue, near the other Pratt family mansions.
 Higgins Hall, located one block south of the main campus, houses the entire School of Architecture with the exception of Construction Management programs. The historic Romanesque Revival landmark building with a contemporary center wing houses the school's Administrative Offices, computer labs, student classrooms and laboratories, a lecture hall, a small café, and the Hazel and Robert H. Siegel Gallery. The building was originally built for the prestigious Adelphi Academy, now Adelphi University in phases from 1868 through 1890 by Mundell and Teckritz and Charles C. Haight. Charles Pratt also partially funded construction of the building as part of his philanthropic efforts. The building was given to Pratt Institute in 1965 by the wife of John Higgins, architect and alumni of Adelphi Academy. The School of Architecture was relocated here. In 1996, the building experienced a major fire, destroying the center wing of the building and severely damaging the northern and southern wings. In 2005, the school replaced the center wing with a new sleek and contemporary glass structure, which linked historic brick northern and southern wings designed by Steven Holl, and incorporated complementary contrast to the original essence. As part of the rebuilding of Higgins Hall, Rogers Marvel Architects restored and renovated the original nineteenth century wings to their former glory.

Historic sites

A number of Pratt Institute's buildings and landscapes are historically significant. The Pratt Institute Historic District is a national historic district that comprises 10 contributing buildings built between 1885 and 1936. Several buildings are recognized as being New York City Designated Landmarks. It was listed on the National Register of Historic Places in 2005 and was awarded the Getty Foundation Campus Heritage Grant. Two buildings outside the historic district, Higgins Hall and the Caroline Ladd Pratt House are also listed on the historic register as being a part of the Clinton Hill Historic District. The buildings and structures listed on the U.S. National Register of Historic Places for their architectural or historical significance are:

Residence halls
Pratt, a residential campus, offers seven different residence options for its students. All residence hall students are provided with a bed (twin extra-long), a desk, a chair and a dresser. Students residing in a dorm without in unit kitchens are required to be on a mandatory meal plan (Stabile, Emerson, ELJ, and Pantas), while those with in unit kitchens are able to sign up for an optional meal plan (Willoughby and Grand Avenue). Emerson Place, Leo J. Pantas Hall, and Vincent A. Stabile Hall are the primary freshman dorms. In total, 51 percent of undergraduate students reside on campus while 92 percent of incoming freshmen students reside on campus. Pratt offers the following residence halls for students to choose from:
 Esther Lloyd-Jones Hall is named for a trendsetter in modern American higher education. The building was originally a private apartment building built in 1921 but was acquired by Pratt in 1964 as use for dormitories. ELJ accommodates students single and double rooms in apartment-style accommodations. ELJ is occupied primarily by upperclassmen continuing students.
 Emerson Hall is the newest dorm on the Pratt campus, opening Fall 2019. It was built specifically to be a freshman dorm. It was collaboratively designed by CannonDesign and Hanrahan Meyers Architects with intention of encouraging interaction. The dorm is off campus, across the street from the Film and Video Building. The dorm contains double rooms, with several individual bathrooms and separate, individual shower rooms on each floor to be shared by those inhabiting each floor. Each floor also contains a large central common space with a small kitchen on each floor.
 Leo J. Pantas Hall was opened in 1987 and designed by Skidmore, Owings and Merrill and sits centrally located on campus. Students live in four-person suites, which consist of two double rooms (two people in each double room), and each suite has its own bathroom. Suites are single sex, but floors are co-ed. The building boasts a work/study rooms and communal lounges. The building was design in brick with a clock tower, echoing the style of original 1887 Main Building. Pantas is primarily a freshmen residence hall.

 Vincent A. Stabile Hall opened in the Fall of 1999 and designed by Pasanella+Klein, Stolzman+Berg Architects. Named for the donor and graduate of the Engineering School, it was designed for new undergraduate students. It houses 240 students in four-person suites. Each suite consists of two double rooms with a shared bath. There are kitchenettes located on each floor. Stabile is primarily a freshmen residence hall.
 The Pratt Townhouses are historic landmarks which were originally constructed from 1901 to 1910 in the colonial revival style to serve as faculty housing. The townhomes were designed by Hobart C. Walker. After being neglected for several years, Pratt renovated the townhouses to be used by upperclassmen. Each unit consists of six single rooms spread across three stories, a full kitchen, living room, parlor, basement, and shared backyard.
 Willoughby Hall is a former private apartment building built as part of Robert Moses' urban renewal projects surround Pratt, and is the largest residence hall. Built in 1957 by architect John Mead Howells, the 16-story building accommodates 800 undergraduate men and women. In addition to the standard furniture, all apartments have a kitchen table, stove, and refrigerator. All students are assigned to double, triple, or single spaces. The converted apartments consist of at least one double or triple that occupies the former living-room space of the apartment. The number of students residing in a given apartment ranges from two to six students, depending upon the size of the converted apartment—studio, one, two, or three bedroom.
 Grand Avenue Residence is home to new and continuing graduate students. The building can accommodate 50 students in efficiency apartments (double and single) and private single rooms within two- and three-bedroom apartments. A double-efficiency apartment is two students sharing a one-room apartment (with kitchen and bath). A single-efficiency apartment is one student in a private one-room apartment with kitchen and bath. A shared single is two or more students, each with its own private bedroom, sharing kitchen, bath, and living room. The building is located one block from campus. Each living room is furnished with a sofa, club chair, coffee table, kitchen table, and chairs.

Transportation

Pratt does not provide any official sponsored transportation options for its students, but there are several public transportation options located directly off Pratt's main campus.

The school is served by MTA New York City Bus routes with the  bus route servicing the campus to the south with stations along DeKalb and Lafayette Avenues and the  bus route serving the area north of the campus along Myrtle Avenue. In addition, the New York City Subway's  has one station located at the intersection of Washington and Lafayette Avenues and another located at the intersection of Classon and Lafayette Avenues. The Clinton–Washington Avenues station (IND Crosstown Line) is located directly across the street from Higgins Hall. The Classon Avenue station (IND Crosstown Line) is located one block south from the south east corner of campus. In addition, the  has an entrance to Clinton–Washington Avenues station (IND Fulton Street Line) four blocks south of the Hall Gate entrance and three blocks south of Higgins Hall.

New York City's public bike-share program, Citi Bike, has stations nearby at Lafayette Avenue and Saint James Place; at Hall Street and Willoughby Avenue; and at Emerson Place and Myrtle Avenue.

The Long Island Rail Road at Atlantic Terminal, is located a short walk from the campus. Pratt participates in New Jersey Transit's University Partnership Program where students can receive a twenty-five percent discount on monthly passes based out of Penn Station in Manhattan.

Pratt Manhattan

The Pratt Manhattan center, located at 144 West 14th Street, between 6th and 7th Avenue, is home to Pratt's associate degrees programs in graphic design, illustration, and digital design and interactive media, an undergraduate program in construction management, several of Pratt's graduate programs including the master's degrees in the School of Information, Facilities management, Design Management, Arts and Cultural Management, and the School of Continuing and Professional Studies which offers an array of non-credit courses and Certificate Programs, including certificates in Digital Design, Advanced Perfumery, Creative Interiors, Floral Art and Design, among many others. This seven story historic building was acquired by Pratt in 2000. The Institute restored the building's exterior to its original facade highlighting its decorative architectural and design elements and renovated the interior to feature its high ceilings and wood beams. A lovely staircase from the building's lobby leads to the Pratt Manhattan Gallery.

This new building houses the School for Information, the Graduate Programs in Design Management, Arts and cultural Management, the two-year associate degree Programs in Digital Design, Graphic Design and Illustration, and the Manhattan office of the School of Continuing and Professional Studies. The modern building has many resources like a library, computer lab and meeting spaces.

In 1974, the New York Phoenix School of Design, formerly the New York School of Applied Design for Women and the Phoenix Art Institute, merged with the Pratt Institute to form the Pratt-New York Phoenix School of Design, which offered three-year certificate programs in art and design at least into the late 1970s. It is located in the landmark New York School of Applied Design Building at 160 Lexington Avenue, at the northwest corner of Lexington and 30th Street. At this time, Manhattan had long been the epicenter of publishing design during the latter-twentieth century. This new commercial-art-dedicated satellite was modeled to apply intensely concentrated vocational training in graphic design, illustration, package design, and textile design. Its faculty was largely composed of Manhattan's working professionals, who themselves had achieved the level of skill necessary to meet the city's global-defining standards. Magazines, books, music albums, movie posters, print and television advertisements and packaging for all forms of retail products were the intended goals for its graduates, as well as Manhattan's omnipresent fashion industry. In addition, the below-ground space in the school was converted into a state of the art printmaking facility, teaching artist-created lithography, silk screening and engraving.

Student life

Clubs and student organizations 
As of October 2022, Pratt is home to 122 clubs with a wide range in focuses. Some of these clubs include the Pratt Photo League, the Latinx Student Alliance, the Pratt Institute Botanical Society, and the Students for Socialist Revolution. Clubs at Pratt don't just hold meetings, but also host on campus events and arrange exhibitions of club members' work.

Pratt Cats
Pratt institute is known for the campus' "Pratt Cats" which roam freely on campus, and inspired the schools' mascot, Charlie. The cats each have their own names and personalities, including but not limited to: Charlie, L'il Mama, Mustachio, Shadow, Thomas, Earl, and Benji. The cats have heated homes on campus, and are fed by staff and students.

Student media
Pratt has several student media groups including a Film Club.
 The Prattler is Pratt's quarterly student magazine/newspaper, established in 1940.
 Static Fish, a comic book publication established over 20 years ago.
 Ubiquitous is Pratt's literary and arts magazine, published twice a year with reading event on campus per semester and also maintains a blog.
 Pratt's yearbook, Prattonia, is designed by selected Pratt students.
 Pratt Radio, a student-run internet radio station broadcasts on the web. Originally broadcasting from a limited-range signal in the mid-1980s, the FCC stepped in and shut the operation down after students modified the broadcast tower, rendering Pratt Radio pirate radio. The station later re-emerged in 2001 as a legitimate internet-only station.
 The Felt is an online journal of poetry and prose from the MFA Writing program.

Fraternities and sororities
The Inter-Greek Council is responsible for all Greek life organizations at Pratt Institute. In total, Pratt offers one fraternity for male students and two sororities for female students:

 Pi Sigma Chi
 Theta Phi Alpha
 Sigma Sigma Sigma

Athletics
Pratt athletic teams are the Cannoneers. The institute is a member of the Division III level of the National Collegiate Athletic Association (NCAA), primarily competing in the Coast to Coast Athletic Conference (C2C) since the 2020–21 academic year. The Cannoneers previously competed in the American Collegiate Athletic Association (ACAA) during their exploratory status in the NCAA Division III ranks from 2018–19 to 2019–20. They also competed as a founding member of the Hudson Valley Intercollegiate Athletic Conference (HVIAC) of the United States Collegiate Athletic Association (USCAA) from 2004–05 to 2017–18.

Pratt competes in 15 intercollegiate varsity sports: Men's sports include basketball, cross country, soccer, tennis, track & field and volleyball; while women's sports include basketball, cross country, soccer, tennis, track & field and volleyball; and co-ed sports include equestrian.

Accomplishments

Men's basketball
The men's basketball team has a storied tradition, including the fourth-longest collegiate basketball rivalry in the nation between Pratt and Polytechnic University (Brooklyn, NY), with Pratt holding the overall record 78–59. The Cannoneers also took home a national collegiate championship title in 1901, and made four NAIA ('59, '60, '61, and '62) and two ECAC ('77,'79) post-season appearances. Former players included Ed Mazria ('62), who was drafted by the New York Knicks, and Anthony Heyward ('94), who currently tours with the And1 streetball team as "Half Man Half Amazing". Bernard Chang was formerly captain of the men's varsity basketball team.

Men's soccer
The men's soccer team won the NAIA tournament in 1959, edging Elizabethtown College 4–3 in double overtime.

Cross country
The women's cross-country team recently captured the 2006 HMWAC championship title and coach Dalton Evans won "Coach of the Year" honors. The men's cross-country team also has a championship title. The women's tennis team has won three HVWAC titles, including an appearance in the ECAC tournament.

Intramurals
In addition, there are intramural activities schedules throughout the year, ranging from individual (tennis and track & field) to team sports (soccer, basketball, volleyball, and touch football). Two premier student intramurals events include the fall classic Halloween Pratt Ratt Outdoor Obstacle Relay Race and the annual Mr. & Ms. Pratt All Thatt Fitness & Artistic Expression Pageant finale.

Others

Facilities
The Athletics Resource Center (A.R.C.) is home to the athletic department, and features the largest clear-span space in Brooklyn. It also hosts the annual Colgate Games, the nation's largest amateur track series for girls from elementary school through college.

Mascot
The school's mascot, the Cannoneer, derives from the 19th century cannon that stands prominently near the main gate to the campus. Cast in bronze in Seville, Spain, the cannon bears the insignia of Philip V and was brought to Pratt from the walls of Morro Castle in Havana, Cuba, in 1899.

Notable alumni

Science, technology, and engineering

 Lloyd Espenschied
 Joshua Davis
 Pelle Petterson
 Bill Garity
 Donald A. Hall
 Irving Langmuir, recipient of the 1932 Nobel Prize in Chemistry.
 John M. Pierce
 David Sarnoff
 Thomas J.R. Hughes

Architecture

 Martin L. Beck
 Guy Bolton
 Alfred Mosher Butts
 Richard Foster
 Henry Hohauser
 Malcolm Holzman
 Fay Kellogg
 Johannes Knoops
 Edward Mazria
 Alan Mruvka
 George Ranalli
 Wallace Rayfield
 Mott B. Schmidt
 Annabelle Selldorf
 Peter L. Shelton
 Robert Siegel
 William Van Allen
 Bruce Wasersztein
 Lorenzo Snow Young
 Carlos Zapata
 Peter Zumthor

Government, politics, and social issues

Attorney
 Lynne Stewart

Congressmen, government officials, and politicians
 Joseph Amenowode
 William D. Byron
 Ben Knight
 George Lincoln Rockwell (left in his final year)
 Elizabeth Crowley

Religious leaders
 Charles E. Pont
 William Howard Hoople

Scholars
 Irvin Leigh Matus

Librarians
 Mary Elizabeth Wood
 Carolyn F. Ulrich

Crime
Leo Frank

American Red Cross
Elva A. George

Entertainment and communications

Musicians
 Suzanne Fiol
 John Flansburgh
 Daniel Lopatin
 Kim Schifino
 Matt Johnson
 Rob Zombie
 James Reams
 Lindsey Way
 Clint Houston
 Lee Sang-eun
 Kat Zhang

Actors
 Harvey Fierstein
 Martin Landau
 Jeff Morrow
 Robert Redford
 Phoebe Robinson
 Melora Walters
 Alexandra Amon

Directors/filmmakers
 Bob Giraldi
 Eric Goldberg
 Hawley Pratt
 Glenn Ficarra
 John Requa
 Robert Wilson
 Shawn Christensen
 Owen Kline

Authors/screenwriters
 Gwendolyn B. Bennett
 Mark Mathew Braunstein
 Rich Burlew
 Daniel Clowes
 Bryan Collier
 Sarah Louise Delany
 Tomie dePaola
 Glenn Ficarra
 Pete Hamill
 Norton Juster
 Arnold Lobel
 Marcus McLaurin
 Laura Numeroff
 John Peterson
 Matthew Reinhart
 John Requa
 Michael Rosen
 Elliot Tiber
 Dante Tomaselli
 Liz Hannah

Communications
 Andre Baruch
 George Lois
 Earl Mayan
 Paul Rand
 Robert Riger
 Louis Silverstein

Journalists
 Robert King

Art and design

Industrial Design
 William Boyer
 Pres Bruning
 Jason Freeny
 Donald Genaro
 Pelle Petterson
 Charles Pollock
 Tony Schwartz

Fashion Design
 Jeffrey Banks
 Donna Chambers
 Ben de Lisi
 Betsey Johnson
 Vera Maxwell
 Norman Norell
 Jeremy Scott
 Barbra Walz

Illustration
 Marshall Arisman
 C. C. Beall
 Daniel Clowes
 Frances W. Delehanty
 Tomie dePaola
 Cheryl Hanna
 Candy Jernigan
 Jacqui Morgan
 Kadir Nelson
 Roberto Parada
 Robert Sabuda
 Bernard Safran
 Sam Savitt
 Gordon A. Sheehan
 Pamela Colman Smith
 Leonard Starr
 Samm Schwartz (Archie comics illustrator)
 Susanne Suba
 Cyndy Szekeres
 Chris Tsirgiotis

Fine Arts
 Imna Arroyo
 Conor Mccreedy
 David Ascalon
 Ken Bald
 Joseph Barbera
 Leigh Behnke
 Aisha Tandiwe Bell
 Trudy Benson
 Dave Berg
 Willard Bond
 Emery Bopp
 Paul Calle
 Aurore Chabot
 Bernard Chang
 Jacky Connolly
 Roger Cook
 Louis Delsarte
 Gus Edson
 Frances Farrand Dodge
 Jules Feiffer
 Richard Gallo
 Mary Godfrey
 Felix Gonzalez-Torres
 Bill Griffith
 Jim Hodges
 Samantha Katz
 Ellsworth Kelly
 Jack Kirby
 Lili Lakich
 Greer Lankton
 Victoria de Lesseps
 Kermit Love
 Gina Lucia
 Peter Max
 Philomena Marano
 Soraya Marcano
 Robert Mapplethorpe
 Wendy McMurdo
 Mort Meskin
 Sergio Rossetti Morosini
 Cyrilla Mozenter
 Marilyn Nance
 Abraham Nathanson
 Martin Nodell
 David Nyzio 
 John Pai
 Roxy Paine
 Denis Peterson
 Albert John Pucci
 David Ratcliff
 Nicholas Reale
 Edna Reindel
 Rob Redding
 Willy Bo Richardson
 Mario Robinson
 Mike Roy
 Stefan Sagmeister
 Jenny Scobel
 Barbara Segal
 Joan Semmel
 Hadieh Shafie
 Nat Mayer Shapiro
 Susan Louise Shatter
 Jean Shin
 Rob Sheridan
 David Silverman
 Joseph A. Smith
 Yoshi Sodeoka
 Therman Statom
 Swoon
 Joseph Szabo
 Susan L. Talbott
 Mickalene Thomas
 Salman Toor
 Boaz Vaadia
 Frank Verlizzo
 Max Weber
 Kent Williams
 William T. Williams
 Terry Winters
 Lance Wyman
 Robert Yasuda
 Marie Zimmermann

Sports
 Sarah Schkeeper

Business
 Fred Trump

Notable faculty

 Andrea Ackerman, artist
 Joseph Barbera, animator and co-creator of the Tom and Jerry series of animated shorts
 Karen Bausman, architect
 Jonathan Beller, film theorist
 Michael Brennan, painter
 Howard Buchwald, artist
 Jonas Coersmeier, architect
 Peggy Cyphers, painter
 Arthur Deshaies, printmaker
 Greg Drasler, painter
 Arthur Wesley Dow, decorative arts
 Shannon Ebner, photographer, chairperson of the photography department
 Fritz Eichenberg, printmaker
 Carla Gannis, artist
 Tula Giannini, musicologist, information scientist
 Philip Guston, painter
 Eric Goldberg, film director and animator
 Stephen Hilger, photographer
 Ralph Johonnot, taught color theory, decorative arts, and interior design (1909–1912), former head of design department.
 Peter Kayafas, photographer
 Sean Kelly, writer
 Josh Koury, filmmaker
 Manuel de Landa (adjunct), philosopher, artist
 Thomas Lanigan-Schmidt, painter
 Jacob Lawrence, painter
 John Lehr (photographer), photographer
 Matthew Leifheit, photographer
 Philip Johnson, architect
 Mickalene Thomas, artist
 Sibyl Moholy-Nagy, architectural and art historian
 Sergio Rossetti Morosini, Painter, Sculptor
 Mario Naves, art critic
 Toshio Odate, Japanese woodworker, sculptor 
 Denis Peterson, painter
 Nick Relph, photographer and filmmaker, K-12 center instructor
 Carole Rosenthal, English and Humanities professor emeritus
 Carissa Rodriguez, photographer
 Nasser Sharify, father of international librarianship
 Matthew Sharpe, author
 Carrie Schneider, photographer
 Anna Shteynshleyger, photographer
 Milagros de la Torre, photographer
 Anne Turyn, photographer 
 Charles Warner, architect
 Eva Zeisel, ceramic artist/designer

References

Further reading

 Elbert Hubbard, 1909, Little Journeys to the Homes
 Tarbell, Ida M. 1904, The History of Standard Oil
 Council for Advancement and Support of Education (CASE) Web site, Pratt Institute page
 Pratt Institute official Web site, History page
 New York Times article announcing end of engineering school

External links

 
 Official athletics website
 Pratt Institute—Documentary produced by Treasures of New York
 

 
Art schools in New York City
Culture of New York City
Educational institutions established in 1887
Historic American Engineering Record in New York City
Historic districts on the National Register of Historic Places in Brooklyn
Universities and colleges in Brooklyn
Universities and colleges in Manhattan
Universities and colleges in New York City
Clinton Hill, Brooklyn
Romanesque Revival architecture in New York City
Renaissance Revival architecture in New York City
University art museums and galleries in New York City
USCAA member institutions
Universities and colleges on Long Island
Private universities and colleges in New York City
1887 establishments in New York (state)